"Try Me" is a song by American singer and actress Jasmine Guy. Released on September 28, 1990, The song features background vocals by vocal band Ex Girlfriend. The song is the first single from her debut studio album, Jasmine Guy released on Warner Bros. Records. The song was a top 20 hit on the Billboard Hot R&B Singles chart in December 1990. Guy performed the song on an episode of Soul Train which aired on November 17, 1990. The extended version is heard in the background of the party on the episode "Good Help is So Hard to Fire" of A Different World.

Music video
To date, there are two versions known. One has a party scene where there is a dance-off between her and her rival over a guy at the party. The other version is a photo shoot scene, and a scene where Guy is dancing behind background dancers.

Charts

References

1990 singles
Jasmine Guy songs
1990 songs
Warner Records singles
Song recordings produced by Full Force